Magdalene (derived from Hebrew "of Magdala") or Magda is a female name used in honor of Mary Magdalene in many countries including Bulgaria, Czech Republic, Georgia, Germany, Greece (Μαγδαληνή, Μάγδα), Hungary, Latvia, Poland, Croatia (Magdalena), Portugal, Romania, Scandinavia, Slovakia, Slovenia and Spain and may refer to:

People 
Magdalene of Bavaria
Magdalene of Brandenburg
Magdalene of Nagasaki
Magdalene Bärens, Danish artist
Magdalen Berns, British lesbian feminist activist
Magda von Dolcke, Danish actor
Magda Apanowicz, Canadian actress of Polish descent
Magda Davitt, Irish singer-songwriter formerly known as Sinéad O'Connor
Magda Gabor, American socialite
Magda Genuin, Italian cross country skier
Magda Goebbels, wife of Joseph Goebbels
Magda Faluhelyi, Hungarian actress
Magda Ianculescu, Romanian operatic soprano
Magda Ilands, Belgian long-distance runner
Magda Kun, Hungarian stage and film actress
Magda László, Hungarian opera singer
Magda Lenkei, Hungarian freestyle swimmer
Magda Lupescu, mistress of Carol II of Romania
Magda Maros, Hungarian fencer
Magdalene Odundo, Kenyan-British potter
Magda Olivero, Italian opera singer
Magdalene Louisa Pietersen (born 1956), South African politician
Magda Peligrad, Romanian mathematician and mathematical statistician 
Magda Rurac, Romanian tennis player
Magda Szabó, Hungarian novelist
Magda Szubanski, Australian actress and TV presenter

Fictional characters 
Magda, a character from the Darkover series by Marion Zimmer Bradley. Magda is a Terran citizen who was raised on Darkover and works for the Empire. 
Magda, a character from the James Bond film Octopussy, played by Kristina Wayborn
Magdalene, a Marvel Comics character
Magda Burlix, a character from The Edge Chronicles books
Magda Czajkowski, a character from the soap opera EastEnders
Magdalen Vanstone, a character from the novel No Name by Wilkie Collins
Magdalena Haloway, a character from the novel Delirium by Lauren Oliver.
Magda, wife of the X-Men villain Magneto, and mother of the Scarlet Witch and Quicksilver.
Magda, Rick Spleen's housekeeper in BBC4 sitcom Lead Balloon.
Maghda, an antagonist from the Diablo game series
Magdalene O. Moriah, or "Mom", the main antagonist of The Binding of Isaac and its remake.

Songs 
"Passion Play (When All the Slaves Are Free)" a song by Joni Mitchell
"The Magdalene Laundries", a song by Joni Mitchell
"Magdalene (my regal zonophone)", a song by Procol Harum from the album Shine on Brightly
"Magdalene", a song by Guy Clark from the album Workbench Songs
"Kyrie for the Magdalene" track by Hans Zimmer from the album The Da Vinci Code
"Magdalena", a song by Pixies  from the album Indie Cindy
"Magdalena", a song by A Perfect Circle from the album Mer de Noms
"Me and Magdalena", a song by the Monkees
"the Magdalene" a song by Foxing

See also
 Magdalena (given name)
 Madeline (name)
 Madeleine (name)

Feminine given names